Juapong is a town in the North Tongu District of the Volta Region It was one of the biggest employer in the Volta Region

References

See also

Populated places in the Volta Region